Charlton Reid Beattie (April 22, 1869 – August 23, 1925) was a United States district judge of the United States District Court for the Eastern District of Louisiana. He was the son of Confederate Army officer, judge, and Republican Party politician Taylor Beattie.

Education and career

Born in Assumption Parish, Louisiana, Beattie was the son of Louisiana politician and judge Taylor Beattie. Like his father, Beattie graduated from the University of Virginia in 1889 and received a Bachelor of Laws from the University of Virginia School of Law in 1891. He was in private practice in Thibodaux, Louisiana from 1892 to 1913, and in New Orleans, Louisiana in 1913. He was also the United States Attorney for the Eastern District of Louisiana from 1909 to 1913. He served on the faculty at Tulane University Law School.

Federal judicial service

On January 13, 1925, Beattie was nominated by President Calvin Coolidge to a seat on the United States District Court for the Eastern District of Louisiana vacated by Judge Rufus Edward Foster. Beattie was confirmed by the United States Senate on January 19, 1925, and received his commission on January 21, 1925. Beattie served in that capacity until his death on August 23, 1925, in Thibodaux.

References

Sources
 

1869 births
1925 deaths
University of Virginia alumni
United States Attorneys for the Eastern District of Louisiana
Judges of the United States District Court for the Eastern District of Louisiana
United States district court judges appointed by Calvin Coolidge
20th-century American judges
Tulane University faculty
Tulane University Law School faculty
People from Thibodaux, Louisiana
University of Virginia School of Law alumni